"Jesus" is a song by Austrian rock musician Helmut Grabher, under the alias Jeremy Faith, released as a single in June 1971 from his album Lord. It was a hit in several European countries and was later covered by Cliff Richard, who had a minor hit with it.

Charts

Certifications

Cliff Richard version

Release
Richard released his version in February 1972 with the B-side "Mister Cloud" which was written by songwriting duo Guy Fletcher and Doug Flett. It was produced by Nick Ingman, credited on the record as 'An NP [Norrie Paramor] production by Nick Ingman'. Ingman also arranged the song and it features his orchestra.

Richard has said "I didn't record a gospel song for a long time after I became a Christian. And Jesus was the first one I did. I was convinced that it would be wrong for me just to record a single – religious sort of gospel content single – just because I was a Christian. And I wanted very much to be sure that it was a good song. And I waited a long time for that particular song, Jesus. But when it came, I instantly knew I had to record that one. We spent a bit time on it too, of course, and did a, you know, did some phasing on it and gave it some effect. And I must say, I was really quite pleased with the recording".

However, after it failed to be particularly successful, Richard said that "somehow it seems very difficult for people to accept me with a gospel single. Everybody else can make them but somehow whenever I do, the motive or intention is held suspect. A number of BBC producers would not play Jesus because of the title although they are perfectly prepared to plug a Hari Krishna [sic] or Maharishi inspired song".

Track listing
7": Columbia / DB 8864
 "Jesus" – 4:15
 "Mister Cloud" – 3:45

Charts

References

Cliff Richard songs
1971 singles
1972 singles
1971 songs
Songs written by Michel Berger
Decca Records singles

Columbia Graphophone Company singles
Song recordings produced by Michel Berger
Songs about Jesus